Mon Phagun is a 2021 Indian Bengali romantic drama television series which was released in July 2021 on Star Jalsha. The series is produced by Acropoliis Entertainment. It stars Sean Banerjee and Srijla Guha as the leads and Rob Dey, Amrita Debnath, Geetashree Roy and Prantik Banerjee in supporting roles. It ended its telecast on 21 August 2022.

Synopsis 
Rishiraj and Priyadarshini are childhood friends, who fell in love with each other in their youth. They were separated after an accident where Priyadarshini lost her parents. After 20 years, Priyadarshini has become a tourist guide by the name Pihu Mitra and Rishiraj is an industrialist calling himself Rishi Sen. Rishi has adopted Pihu's elder sister, Rusha, as his sister. The two meet in North Bengal.

Cast

Main 
 Sean Banerjee as Rishiraj Sen Sharma aka Rishi Sen/Tubai/Fake Romeo – an arrogant and ruthless business tycoon, owner of RS Enterprise; Pihu's childhood lover turned husband (2021 – 2022)
 Swarnava Sanyal as young Rishiraj (2021)
 Srijla Guha as Priyadarshini Sen Sharma (née Mitra) aka Pihu – a cheerful girl and tourist guide; Rishiraj's childhood lover turned wife (2021 – 2022)
 Preksha Saha as young Pihu (2021)

Recurring 
Rishi's Family
 Geetashree Roy as Sudarshini Mitra aka Rusha Sen Sur – Pihu's elder sister; Rishi's adoptive sister; Soumen's wife (2021–2022)
 Prantik Banerjee as Soumen Sur – Rusha's husband, Shalini's ex-husband; Pihu and Rishi's former rival;was a smuggler by profession, Monica's biological brother (2021–2022)
 Rob Dey as Ritwik Sen Sharma – Rishi's cousin brother; Anushka's husband (2021 – 2022)
 Amrita Debnath as Anushka Sen Sharma (née Hazra) – Pihu's cousin sister; Ritwik's wife (2021 – 2022)
 Saswati Guha Thakurta as Pramila Sen Sharma – Rishiraj's grandmother; Apratim, Pratim and Rijula's mother (2021 – 2022)
 Kaushik Chakraborty as Apratim Sen Sharma – Rishiraj's estranged father (2022)
 Sohini Sanyal as Madhumanti Sen Sharma – Rishiraj's mother; Apratim's estranged wife (2022)
 Arijit Chowdhury as Pratim Sen Sharma – Apratim's younger brother; Rishi's paternal uncle; Soumi and Ritwik's father (2021 – 2022)
 Shreyasee Samanta as Malobika Sen Sharma – Soumi and Ritwik's mother (2021 – 2022)
 Ananya Sen as Soumi Sen Sharma – Ritwik's younger sister; Rishi's cousin sister (2021 – 2022)
 Ananya Sengupta as Rijula Roy (née Sen Sharma) – Rishi, Soumi and Ritwik's paternal aunt; Tanni and Bambi's mother (2021 – 2022)
 Neel Mukherjee as Somraj Roy – a chartered accountant; Rijula's husband; Tanni and Bambi's father (2021 – 2022)
 Arpita Sarkar as Tanisha Roy / Tanni – Rjula's daughter; Rishi, Soumi and Ritwik's youngest cousin sister (2021 – 2022)

Pihu and Anushka's Family
 Mallika Majumdar as Mousumi Hazra – Pihu's maternal aunt; Anushka's mother (2021 – 2022)
 Biswanath Basu as Paritosh Hazra – Anushka's father (2021 – 2022)
 Mou Bhattacharjee as Minu Pisi – Anushka's paternal aunt (2021)

Others
 Sam Bhattacharya as Rohan Sen Sharma – Monica's estranged son with Apratim, Rishi's rival (2022)
 Shaon Dey as Monica Sur – Apratim's PA and girlfriend; Soumen's elder sister and Rohan's mother (2022)
 Ankusree Maity as Niharika – Ritwik's business partner and one-sided lover (2022)
 Hritojeet Chatterjee as Dr. Mayukh – Ritwik's cousin, Rusha's love-interest (2022)
 Ritwick Purakait (2022) as Ashutosh- A lawyer, Soumi's love interest
 Oindrila Bose as Priyanka Roy Chowdhury Pri – Judhajit's daughter; Rishi's college friend (2022)
 Debraj Mukherjee as Judhajit Roy Chowdhury – Rishi's business partner; Monica's former peon (2022)
 Arunava Dey as Uday – Debabrata's paternal grandson, Priyanka's husband (2022)
 Aishi Bhattacharya as Mili – Fake Priyodorshini, niece of Monica, Pihu's rival (2022)
 Sayak Chakraborty as Sarthak – Mili's boyfriend (2022)
 Shyamashis Pahari as Ritwik's paternal uncle, Malobika's brother (2022)
 Sangita Ghosh as Shalini Sur – Soumen's first wife (2022)
 Debojit Sarkar as Ghoton – Soumen's sidekick (2021 – 2022)
 Aritram Mukherjee as Shobhon – Anushka's ex-fiancée; Soumen's crime partner (2022)
 Gora Dhar as Bhabesh Babu – Rishi's manager (2021 – 2022)
 From Reshamdighi 
 Roshni Tanwi Bhattacharya as Netra-Romeo's childhood friend and lover (2022)
 Subhojit Kar as Bhima-Romeo's cousin brother and rival, who murdered him (2022)
 Rajasree Bhowmick as Romeo's mother (2022)
 Sandip Dey as Romeo's father aka Bhanu- head of Reshamdighi village (2022)
 Boni Mukherjee as Bhima's mother (2022)

Guest appearances 
 Ankush Hazra as himself (14 February 2022)
 Lagnajita Chakraborty as herself (14 February 2022)
 Shovon Gangopadhyay as himself (14 February 2022)
 Koneenica Banerjee as Sohochori aka Soi from Aay Tobe Sohochori (14 February 2022)
 Arunima Haldar as Borfi from Aay Tobe Sohochori (14 February 2022)
 Deblina Chatterjee as herself (14 February 2022)

Reception 
Initially, the show did not feature in the top slots of the TRP leaderboard after its debut and was placed on an average rating on Bengali television for the first five months of its airing. Gradually, however, the show increased in its TRP ratings to ultimately reach 2nd highest rating on television, and was one of the most popular shows on Star Jalsha for a long time. But, its trp rating points dropped in late April and led to the end of the show.

TRP Ratings

Production 
The shooting again began in the month of June 2021 after the relaxation of the COVID-19 lockdown in West Bengal.

References

External links 
 
 Mon Phagun at Disney+ Hotstar

2021 Indian television series debuts
Star Jalsha original programming
2022 Indian television series endings
Bengali-language television programming in India